The following lists events that happened during 2006 in Cambodia.

Incumbents 
 Monarch: Norodom Sihamoni 
 Prime Minister: Hun Sen

Events

June
 June 7 - The World Bank Group says Cambodia must repay US$7.6 million in development funds that were mishandled.
 June 16 - Reacting to a report by Human Rights Watch, the United Nations High Commission for Refugees denies that Montagnard refugees and asylum seekers who have been returned to Vietnam from camps in Cambodia have been abused.

October
 October 30 - China to enhance relations with Cambodia.

December
 December 4 - Former US President Bill Clinton partakes in signing ceremony on behalf of his Clinton Foundation with Prime Minister Hun Sen in Phnom Penh.

See also
List of Cambodian films of 2006

References

 
Years of the 21st century in Cambodia
Cambodia
2000s in Cambodia
Cambodia